The Emirati Chess Championship is organized by the United Arab Emirates Chess Federation. It is one of the major national chess competitions of the United Arab Emirates held at standard time controls, the other being the UAE President's Cup, which has been held annually since 1994.

Winners since 2001

{| class="sortable wikitable"
! Year !! Champion
|-
| 2001 || Taleb Moussa
|-
| 2002 || Nabil Saleh
|-
| 2003 ||Taleb Moussa
|-
| 2005 || Othman Moussa
|-
| 2007 || 
|-
| 2008 || Salem Saleh
|-
| 2011 ||Salem Saleh
|-
| 2012 ||Salem Saleh
|-
| 2015 || Saeed Ishaq
|- 
| 2016 ||Saeed Ishaq
|- 
| 2017 ||Salem Saleh
|}

References

Chess in the United Arab Emirates
Chess national championships
Chess